Subi-myeon is a rural township in Yeongyang County, Gyeongsangbuk-do, South Korea. More than 90% of that area is unused by humans; the local population numbers only 2,016. Of these, 67% are members of farming households which are divided among 15 ri.

Local attractions include the site of a kiln from the 17th century, and a medicinal spring that is said to have cured the illness of Joseon Dynasty scholar Yakcheon Geum Hui-seong.

See also
Subdivisions of South Korea
Geography of South Korea

Notes

External links
Government website (in Korean)

Towns and townships in North Gyeongsang Province
Yeongyang County